Hindu scriptures are traditionally classified into two parts: śruti, meaning "what has been heard" (originally transmitted orally) and Smriti, meaning "what has been retained or remembered" (originally written, and attributed to individual authors). The Vedas are classified under śruti.

The following list provides a somewhat common set of reconstructed dates for the terminus ante quem of Hindu texts, by title and genre. It is notable that Hinduism largely followed an oral tradition to pass on knowledge, for which there is no record of historical dates. All dates here given ought to be regarded as roughly approximate, subject to further revision, and generally as relying for their validity on highly inferential methods and standards of evidence.

Samhita, Brahmana layers of the Vedas 
Rigveda, 1500 – 1100 BCE
Samaveda, 1200 - 800 BCE
Yajurveda, 1100 - 800 BCE
Atharvaveda, 1000 - 800 BCE

The early Upanishads were composed over 900 - 300 BCE.

Others 
Mahabharata, 400 BCE(Origins likely in the 8th or 9th century BCE)
Bhagavad Gita, 400 BCE
Ramayana, 400 BCE<ref>Chaurasia, Radhey Shyam. History of Ancient India: Earliest Times to 1000 A. D.. p. 38:"the Kernel of the Ramayana was composed before 500 B.C. while the more recent portion were not probably added till the 2nd century B.C. and later."</ref>Samkhya SutraMimamsa Sutra, 300-200 BCEArthashastra, 400 BCE - 200 CENyāya Sūtras, 2nd century BCEVaiśeṣika Sūtra, 2nd century BCEYoga Sutras of Patanjali, 100 BCE - 500 BCEBrahma Sutra, 500  BCEPuranas, 250 – 1000 CEShiva Sutras, 120 BCEAbhinavabharati, 950 - 1020 CEYoga Vasistha, 750 CE Hanneder, Jürgen; Slaje, Walter. Moksopaya Project: Introduction .

See also
List of historic Indian texts
Sangam literatureManusmriti''

References

Timelines of Hinduism
Hindu texts